{{DISPLAYTITLE:C30H47N3O9S}}
The molecular formula C30H47N3O9S (molar mass: 625.78 g/mol) may refer to:

 Eoxin C4, or 14,15-leukotriene C4
 Leukotriene C4

Molecular formulas